Węgrzynowo  is a village in the administrative district of Gmina Mała Wieś, within Płock County, Masovian Voivodeship, in east-central Poland.

Between 1975 and 1998 it was administered as part of the Płock Voivodeship.

References

Villages in Płock County